The Louisville Limestone is a geologic formation in Ohio. It preserves fossils dating back to the Silurian period.

See also

 List of fossiliferous stratigraphic units in Ohio

References

 

Silurian Ohio
Silurian Kentucky
Silurian southern paleotemperate deposits
Homerian
Gorstian
Ludfordian